Boris Without Béatrice is a 2016 Canadian drama film directed by Denis Côté. It was selected to compete for the Golden Bear at the 66th Berlin International Film Festival.

The film stars James Hyndman as Boris Malinovsky, a man who begins having several extramarital affairs to deal with his emotional and companionship needs, while caring for his wife Beatrice (Simone-Élise Girard), who has withdrawn from the world in a self-induced state of catatonic silence that defies diagnosis.

Cast
 James Hyndman as Boris
 Simone-Élise Girard as Beatrice
 Denis Lavant as l'Inconnu
 Isolda Dychauk as Klara
 Dounia Sichov as Helga

Awards

References

External links
 

2016 films
2016 drama films
2010s French-language films
Canadian drama films
Films directed by Denis Côté
French-language Canadian films
2010s Canadian films